Barbeques Galore is Australia's biggest specialist BBQs and outdoor furniture retailer, owned by Quadrant Private Equity It specializes in barbecue grills, accessories and consumables. There are over 90 stores in Australia, and several authorized dealers internationally. 

With brands including Ziegler and Brown, Kamado Joe, Prosmoke, Traeger, Beefeater, and Saxon, Barbeques Galore offers a wide range of gas and solid fuel barbeques, fuels and consumables, accessories, heating, and outdoor furniture.

History
Barbeques Galore was founded by Max Mason in Sydney, Australia in 1977. The company expanded to the United States in 1980, opening a store in Santa Fe Springs, California, a suburb of Los Angeles. After ten years as a listed company on the Australian Stock Exchange, Barbeques Galore delisted in 1996, and soon after listed on the US NASDAQ. In late 2005, the firm was delisted from the NASDAQ after a leveraged buy-out by Australian venture capital firm, Ironbridge Capital.
Ironbridge Capital split the Australian and US arms of the business into two separate entities (but retained ownership of both).

Following a severe downturn in business in the US, partly attributed to the fall in new housing on the back of the sub-prime mortgage crisis, Barbeques Galore USA filed for protection under Chapter 11 on 15 August 2008. Barbeques Galore US assets were purchased by Grand Home Holdings Inc. on 12 September 2008.

In 2016, the Australian company was acquired by Quadrant Private Equity. In 2019 Barbeques Galore's sales were close to the $200 million mark 
As part of a transformation of the brand, in 2020 Barbeques Galore launched a new TV campaign, ‘Now you’re cooking’, and also commenced the rollout of new design stores, creating a more engaging in-store experience.  The company also added a number of new product ranges, including the introduction of fresh BBQ cuts of meat into a number of stores.

Later that year, Inside Retail included Barbeques Galore on its list of the 20 coolest retailers for 2020. In 2021, Barbeques Galore won Gold at the Sydney Design Awards for its new concept store in Everton Park, QLD, and in 2022 was a winner at the Australian Retail Innovators Awards for the development and launch of the BBQ Legends loyalty program. 

In 2022 the company outlined growth plans to open a number of new stores, expand ranges in store and online, and make further investment in its systems.

Products 
Barbeques Galore is the exclusive Australian distributor of the Ziegler & Brown range of barbeques and accessories, including the award-winning Ziggy range of portable grills. Barbeques Galore also exclusively offers the Beefmaster range of barbeques, which carry a range of features including the SearPRO cooking system, Structural Heat Retention, and a 6-year warranty.

Barbeques Galore distributes Kamado Joe ceramic grills and accessories, and also carries a wide range of other leading brands, including Beefeater, Everdure by Heston Blumenthal, ProQ, Masterbuilt, and Traeger.

These brands are supported by a range of barbeque fuels, sauces, rubs, and other cooking accessories, and a range of outdoor furniture products. Heating products include the Saxon, Austwood and Norseman brand indoor wood heaters.

References

Barbecue
Retail companies of Australia
Retail companies established in 1972
1972 establishments in Australia
Companies based in Sydney